The Tipsport Golf Masters was a golf tournament on the Ladies European Tour. It was played at the Golf Park Plzeň – Dýšina in Plzeň, Czech Republic.

Tournament names through the years:
2011–2012 Raiffeisenbank Prague Golf Masters
2013 Honma Pilsen Golf Masters
2014 Sberbank Golf Masters
2015−2016 Tipsport Golf Masters

Winners

External links
Coverage on the Ladies European Tour's official site

Former Ladies European Tour events
Golf tournaments in the Czech Republic
Sport in Prague
Sport in Plzeň
Recurring sporting events established in 2011
Recurring sporting events disestablished in 2016